Joe Johnston (born 31 January 1998) is a New Zealand rugby union player, currently playing for the New England Free Jacks of Major League Rugby (MLR). His preferred position is flanker.

Professional career
Johnston signed for Major League Rugby side New England Free Jacks ahead of the 2021 Major League Rugby season. He had previously represented  in the 2019 and 2020 seasons of the Mitre 10 Cup, while he was also selected to play for the China Lions in the 2020 Global Rapid Rugby season.

References

External links
itsrugby.co.uk Profile

1998 births
Living people
New Zealand rugby union players
Rugby union flankers
Bay of Plenty rugby union players
New England Free Jacks players